Heliophanus demonstrativus is a jumping spider species in the genus Heliophanus. Found in East and Southern Africa, the species was first described by Wanda Wesołowska in 1986.

References

Spiders described in 1986
Salticidae
Spiders of Africa
Taxa named by Wanda Wesołowska